St Lawrence Church is a parish church in the Church of England in Winchester.

History
The church is just off the High Street, in Winchester, England. It is probably of Norman origin, and is said to have been the chapel of William the Conqueror's palace (built 1069–70, destroyed 1141) with a tower added in the 15th century. The church is now almost wholly surrounded by adjacent buildings. It is recorded as being restored in 1475–7, in 1672 (the present roof dates from this restoration), 1847–8, 1881, and 1979–80.

St Lawrence Church is a Grade II listed building.

Organ
The church contains a two manual pipe organ dating from 1882 by Jones and Son of Fulham which was almost completely replaced by George Osmond in 1966. A specification of the organ can be found on the National Pipe Organ Register.

Rectors
The parish of St Lawrence was combined in 1904 with the parish of St Maurice (church demolished in 1957) and in 1973 with the parish of St Swithun-upon-Kingsgate whose church is now a chapel of ease in the parish of St Lawrence with St Swithun, which is in a united benefice with the parish of St Bartholomew, Hyde since 2010.

References 
 Pevsner, N. Hampshire: Winchester & the North (2010)  (with Michael Bullen, John Crook and Rodney Hubbuck) (Buildings of England series)
 Church of St Lawrence, Winchester in British Listed Buildings

Church of England church buildings in Hampshire
Grade II listed churches in Hampshire
St Lawrence